Marijn van den Berg (born 19 July 1999) is a Dutch cyclist, who currently rides for UCI WorldTeam . His brother Lars is also a cyclist.

Major results

2017
 2nd E3 Harelbeke Junioren
 6th La route des Géants
 7th Gent–Wevelgem Juniors
2018
 5th Overall Olympia's Tour
1st Stage 6
 9th Slag om Norg
2019
 1st  Overall Carpathian Couriers Race
1st  Points classification
1st  Young rider classification
1st Stage 2
 3rd Road race, National Under-23 Road Championships
 10th Overall Czech Cycling Tour
2020
 1st Stage 1 Orlen Nations Grand Prix
2021
 1st  Overall Orlen Nations Grand Prix
1st Stages 1 & 2
 1st GP Adria Mobil
 Tour de l'Avenir
1st  Points classification
1st Stages 2 (TTT), 3 & 5
 1st Stage 1 Alpes Isère Tour
 3rd Time trial, National Under-23 Road Championships
 3rd Overall A Travers les Hauts de France
1st  Young rider classification
 3rd Paris–Tours Espoirs
 4th Overall L'Étoile d'Or
 5th Overall Kreiz Breizh Elites
 8th Road race, UEC European Under-23 Road Championships
2022
 7th Clásica de Almería
 7th Grand Prix de Wallonie
 10th Coppa Bernocchi
2023
 1st Trofeo Ses Salines–Alcúdia
 3rd Figueira Champions Classic

References

External links

1999 births
Living people
Dutch male cyclists